Joachim of Fürstenberg (1538–1598) was a Count of Fürstenberg-Heiligenberg, a vassalate of the Holy Roman Empire. His wife was Countess Anna of Zimmern. He was succeeded by his son, Frederick IV of Fürstenberg.

References 

Counts of Fürstenberg
1538 births
1598 deaths